Chris Brookes (born 24 August 1991) is an English professional wrestler. He is currently signed to DDT Pro-Wrestling, where he is a two-time DDT Universal Champion.

Career

Progress Wrestling (2017–2019) 
On 24 August 2019, at Progress x APC, an event organised in collaboration between Progress Wrestling and the French Association les Professionels du Catch (APC), Brookes lost to Tristan Archer in a three way match also including Aigle Blanc and failed to capture the APC Championship.

Revolution Pro Wrestling (2017–2018) 
Alongside Travis Banks as CCK (Commonwealth Catch Kings), Brookes won the Revolution Pro Wrestling tag team titles from Charlie Sterling and Joel Redman in his first match for the company. CCK successfully defended those titles against a number of teams including Ryan Smile and Shane Strickland, Sami Callihan and Martin Stone, and Los Ingobernables de Japón (Bushi and Hiromu Takahashi) before losing the belts to Moustache Mountain (Trent Seven and Tyler Bate).

CCK had a successful Global Wars 2017, defeating Chaos (Rocky Romero and Yoshi-Hashi) on the first night of the event and successfully teaming with Kid Lykos on the second night against the team of Gedo, Hirooki Goto and Yoshi-Hashi. CCK then attempted to regain the tag team titles from new champions Suzuki-gun (Minoru Suzuki and Zack Sabre Jr.) but lost to the champions at Epic Encounter 2018.

DDT Pro-Wrestling (2019–present) 
Brookes started wrestling for DDT Pro-Wrestling in June 2019. He notably began teaming with Masahiro Takanashi before naming themselves CDK (Calamari Drunken Kings). At Wrestle Peter Pan, Brookes and Takanashi defeated Moonlight Express (Mao and Mike Bailey). At Summer Vacation, Brookes lost to Konosuke Takeshita and did not win the KO-D Openweight Championship. From 29 November to 28 December 2019, Brookes was an entrant in the 2020 edition of the D-Oh Grand Prix where he tied Tetsuya Endo for first place in block A. A decision match was held between the two men which he lost. In January, Brookes announced that he would be moving to Japan for a whole year, as he wants DDT to be his number one commitment.

On 23 February 2020, at Into The Fight, he defeated Takeshita and became the inaugural DDT Universal Champion. On 20 March, at Judgement 2020: DDT 23rd Anniversary, he lost the title to Daisuke Sasaki.

On 14 March 2021, at Day Dream Believer 2021 he won his first DDT Extreme Championship title by defeating Shunma Katsumata in a Barbed Wire Coffin Deathmatch.

On 20 March 2022, at Judgement 2022: DDT 25th Anniversary, CDK defeated Disaster Box (Harashima and Naomi Yoshimura) to win their first KO-D Tag Team Championship. On 23 April Brookes won the King of Street Wrestling tournament by defeating Abdullah Kobayashi in the final.

Championships and accomplishments
Attack! Pro Wrestling
Attack! 24:7 Championship (1 time)
Attack! Tag Team Championship (5 times) – with Kid Lykos (4) and Kid Lykos II (1)
Combat Zone Wrestling
CZW World Tag Team Championship (1 time) – with Kid Lykos
DDT Pro-Wrestling
DDT Extreme Championship (1 time)
DDT Universal Championship (2 times)
Ironman Heavymetalweight Championship (2 times)
KO-D Tag Team Championship (1 time) – with Masahiro Takanashi
King of Street Wrestling (2022)
Fight Club: Pro
 FCP Championship (1 time)
 FCP Tag Team Championship (2 times) – with Kid Lykos (1) and Kyle Fletcher (1)
Gatoh Move Pro Wrestling
Asia Dream Tag Team Championship (1 time, current) – with Masahiro Takanashi
Pro Wrestling Illustrated
Ranked No. 154 of the top 500 singles wrestlers in the PWI 500 in 2022
Progress Wrestling
 Progress Tag Team Championship (3 times) – with Kid Lykos
Revolution Pro Wrestling
 RPW Undisputed British Tag Team Championship (1 time) – with Travis Banks
Singapore Pro Wrestling
SPW Southeast Asian Tag Team Championship (1 time, current) - with Masa Takanashi
Southside Wrestling Entertainment
 SWE Tag Team Championship (1 time) – with Kid Lykos
Westside Xtreme Wrestling
 wXw Shotgun Championship (1 time)

Notes

References

External links
 

1991 births
Living people
21st-century professional wrestlers
English male professional wrestlers
Expatriate professional wrestlers in Japan
Sportspeople from Tipton
DDT Extreme Champions
DDT Universal Champions
KO-D Tag Team Champions
PROGRESS Tag Team Champions